Impact Direct Ministries (IDM), established in 2001, is a non-profit community-based organisation operating in South Africa with the main operational base in Cape Town, Western Cape. It was founded by Apostle Roger Petersen and operated by Cape Town Christian Fellowship Church. IDM serves local communities through a number of outreach programs and is known for The Reconstructed Project, a program to reconstruct ex-drug addicts. Other projects include youth outreach, children's aftercare, seniors and entrepreneurship programs. IDM is also one of the partners with CPUT, Department of Information Technology, who started the Athlone Living lab.

Amongst its many outreaches; Impact Direct Ministries (IDM) has been involved in its Spiritual and Moral Awakening Program for a number of years. Through this program IDM have witnessed the lives of many people in communities dramatically transformed. A large part of these people were formerly involved in Drug Abuse and its related Social Ills. Subsequently, some of the people, because of their own successful reconstruction, expressed the desire to see others enjoy the same Free from Drugs Transformation. A mobile counselling service was birthed using MXit as a platform where people can receive advice and support.

References

External links 
Official website

Non-profit organisations based in South Africa
Cape Town
Organizations established in 2001
Christian organizations established in the 21st century